Lalit Mohan Gandhi (2 October 1951 – 6 December 2016) was an Indian National Congress politician from Odisha.

Elected in the Odisha Legislative Assembly election in 1977 and 1980 from Titlagarh constituency, in 1980 he served as Minister of State, Information Broadcasting and Public Relations and Planning and Coordination under Janaki Ballabh Patnaik.

Gandhi died on 6 December 2016, of injuries suffered while trying to reboard his train after a brief halt at Khariar Road railway station.

He is survived by his wife, two daughters and a son.

References 

1951 births
2016 deaths
Odisha politicians
Indian National Congress politicians
Members of the Odisha Legislative Assembly
People from Balangir district
State cabinet ministers of Odisha
Railway accident deaths in India
Indian National Congress politicians from Odisha